The Raspberry Island Lighthouse is a lighthouse located on the southern part of Raspberry Island,  marking the west channel of the Apostle Islands in Lake Superior in Bayfield County, Wisconsin, near the city of Bayfield.  It was erected in 1862, marking the western channel.

History

It is said to be one of the few surviving wood framed lighthouses left on Lake Superior. The complex includes a square tower rising up from the attached Lighthouse keeper's quarters, a brick fog signal building, frame barn, brick oil house, boathouse, two outhouses, and a dock.

The light was automated in 1947 and was later transferred to the National Park Service as part of the Apostle Islands National Lakeshore.  It is a contributing property of the Apostle Islands Lighthouses and was added to the National Register of Historic Places in 1977. It is also listed in the Library of Congress Historic American Buildings Survey, WI-312. The original Fresnel lens is on display at the Madeline Island Historical Museum.

The old battery system in the fog signal building was replaced by a solar powered 300 mm Tideland Signal acrylic optic atop a pole, which continues to light the island to this day.  The location is an active aid to navigation, with a characteristic white flash every 2.5 seconds.

Access
Most of the Apostle Islands light stations may be viewed (but not accessed) on the Apostle Islands Cruise Service water taxi or by private boat during the summer. During the Annual Apostle Island Lighthouse Celebration Ferry tour service is available for all the lighthouses. In the tourist season, park rangers are on the island to greet visitors.

See also
Apostle Islands Lighthouses

References

Further reading
 Havighurst, Walter (1943) The Long Ships Passing: The Story of the Great Lakes, Macmillan Publishers.
 Oleszewski, Wes, Great Lakes Lighthouses, American and Canadian: A Comprehensive Directory/Guide to Great Lakes Lighthouses, (Gwinn, Michigan: Avery Color Studios, Inc., 1998) .
 
 Wright, Larry and Wright, Patricia, Great Lakes Lighthouses Encyclopedia Hardback (Erin: Boston Mills Press, 2006) .

External links

Aerial photos of Raspberry Island Light, Marina.com
Library of Congress Historic American Buildings Survey Survey number HABS WI-312
Madeline Island Historical Museum
Lighthouse friends, Raspberry Island Light article
National Park Service  Maritime History Project, Inventory of Historic Light Stations - Wisconsin - Raspberry Island Light Station

Lighthouse Restored Video produced by Wisconsin Public Television

Lighthouses completed in 1862
Houses completed in 1862
Apostle Islands National Lakeshore
Buildings and structures in Bayfield County, Wisconsin
Lighthouses on the National Register of Historic Places in Wisconsin
Tourist attractions in Bayfield County, Wisconsin
1862 establishments in Wisconsin
National Register of Historic Places in Bayfield County, Wisconsin